Big Piney may refer to:

 Big Piney, Wyoming, a town
 Big Piney, Missouri, an unincorporated community

See also
 Big Pine (disambiguation)
 Big Piney River